Číchov is a municipality and village in Třebíč District in the Vysočina Region of the Czech Republic. It has about 200 inhabitants.

Geography
It lies in the Křižanov Highlands. The Jihlava River flows through the municipality.

Transport
Číchov lies on the railway between Jihlava and Brno.

References

Villages in Třebíč District